Juan de Jesús Pascualli Gómez (28 June 1950 – 29 April 2010) was a Mexican politician from the National Action Party. From 2009 to 2010 he served as Deputy of the LXI Legislature of the Mexican Congress representing Guanajuato.

References

1950 births
2010 deaths
Politicians from Guanajuato
People from San Miguel de Allende
National Action Party (Mexico) politicians
21st-century Mexican politicians
Deputies of the LXI Legislature of Mexico
Members of the Chamber of Deputies (Mexico) for Guanajuato